Remigio Cabello Toral (1869–1936) was a Spanish typesetter and politician, member of the Spanish Socialist Workers' Party (PSOE).

Biography 
Born in Valladolid in 1869, Cabello was one of the founders of the Valladolid's Socialist Grouping back in 1894. He earned a seat as Valladolid municipal councillor in 1911. He became the chairman of the PSOE in 1931, following the renunciation of Julián Besteiro. He was replaced at the helm of the party by Francisco Largo Caballero, subsequently becoming deputy chairman. He was elected as member of the Republican Cortes at the 1931 general election in representation of Valladolid, commanding  votes. He died in Madrid on 16 May 1936.

References 
Citations

Bibliography
 
 
 
 

Spanish typographers and type designers
Valladolid city councillors
Spanish Socialist Workers' Party politicians
1869 births
1936 deaths
Members of the Congress of Deputies of the Second Spanish Republic